Shelby Maldonado (born July 24, 1987) is an American politician affiliated with the Democratic Party. Maldonado represented the 56th district, centered in Central Falls, in the Rhode Island House of Representatives from 2015 to 2019. Maldonado announced her resignation in December 2019.

References

1987 births
Living people
Democratic Party members of the Rhode Island House of Representatives
Hispanic and Latino American state legislators in Rhode Island
Hispanic and Latino American women in politics
21st-century American politicians
21st-century American women politicians
20th-century American women